Rapanea perakensis is a species of broadleaf evergreen plant in the family Primulaceae. It is endemic to Peninsular Malaysia. The species is threatened by habitat loss.

References

perakensis
Endemic flora of Peninsular Malaysia
Near threatened flora of Asia
Taxonomy articles created by Polbot